Jan Macaré (also Macare, Maccare; 5 July 1686, in Middelburg – 8 January 1742, in Batavia, Dutch East Indies) was an acting Dutch Governor of Ceylon during an interregnum from 7 June 1736 until 23 July 1736.

Macaré was the fifth son of Susanne Willeboorts (1657–1703) and Pieter Pietersz Macaré (1646–1712), merchant in Middelburg. In 1700, his father sold his business in Middelburg to join the Dutch East India Company and sailed with his wife and four youngest children, including Jan, on the ship Oostersteyn from January to September 1702 to Batavia. In January 1703  they sailed to Ceylon, where Pieter had been appointed as a fiscal inspector.  Jan's mother died on the way to Ceylon.  Jan joined the VOC early on, assisting his father in his work. He moved to Batavia in 1715, where he was schepen in the 1720s. In 1732 he was appointed commander of Galle, so that he returned to Ceylon in October of that year. He disliked the corrupt environment and requested to be returned to Batavia. Before this wish was granted he was asked to take the position of acting governor of Ceylon after the death of governor Domburgh, awaiting the arrival of the newly appointed governor Van Imhoff. On his brief watch the relationship with the king of Kandy improved. In early 1737 he returned to Batavia, where he died in 1742. In Batavia, Macaré had a relation with an Indonesian woman, Suzanna van Macassar, with whom he had a daughter, Johanna Adriana Macaré (1730–1779).

References

1686 births
1742 deaths
18th-century Dutch people
Dutch expatriates in Sri Lanka
Governors of Dutch Ceylon
People from Middelburg, Zeeland
Dutch East India Company people